WFPS may refer to:

 WFPS 92.1 FM, Freeport, Illinois, USA; a radio station
 Wi-Fi positioning system, a geolocation system that uses the characteristics of nearby Wi-Fi
 Winnipeg Fire Paramedic Service, Winnipeg, Manitoba, Canada
 West Fargo Public Schools, West Fargo, North Dakota, USA
 West Feliciana Parish Public Schools, West Feliciana Parish, Louisiana, USA

See also

 WFP (disambiguation), including the singular of WFPs